Culross Island is an island near the western end of Prince William Sound of the Gulf of Alaska in Alaska, United States. It lies just off the Northeast corner of the Kenai Peninsula, separated from it by the Culross Passage. Approximately, Culross Island is 16 miles or 27 kilometers Southeast of Whittier in the Valdez-Cordova region. The island has a land area of 74.709 km2 (28.845 sq mi) and had no population at the 2000 census. 

Culross Island is home to Goose Bay Cabin and Goose Bay Campground which is federally owned and managed by the USDA Forest Service. Goose Bay is approximately 25 miles or 40 kilometers Southeast of Whittier. The 16x16 ft or 78 meters squared cabin has been rebuilt as its original had been destroyed by an avalanche. The island which reaches up to 1,519 feet or approximately 463 meters could be a factor for the avalanche.

The island is currently undergoing a claim of Adverse Possession as of Alaska Statute 09.130.030 or Senate Bill 93 which states that any person(s) may claim land within 10 years or 7 years with good faith.

References
Culross Island: Block 1020, Census Tract 3, Valdez-Cordova Census Area, Alaska United States Census Bureau
 Culross Island: Goose Bay Cabin
 Alaska Guide, Culross Island
 Alaska.org, Culross Island Campsite
 Department of Interior,ID 2088
 Alaska Legislature, Senate Bill 93

Islands of Alaska
Islands of Chugach Census Area, Alaska
Islands of Unorganized Borough, Alaska
Uninhabited islands of Alaska